Catherine Taylor or Cat Taylor (born 11 August 1989) is a British orienteer.

She made her international breakthrough by winning a bronze medal in the long distance at the 2014 European Orienteering Championships in Palmela. The next year at the 2015 World Orienteering Championships in Inverness, Scotland, she placed sixth in the long distance.

Taylor also won the 2012 British sprint Championships at University of York and has won the overall JK Title twice.

She was a student at the University of Edinburgh from 2011 to 2012, and competed for EUOC.

References

External links
 
 

1989 births
Living people
British orienteers
Foot orienteers
Alumni of the University of Edinburgh